The 2006 Women's National Invitation Tournament was a single-elimination tournament of 40 NCAA Division I teams that were not selected to participate in the 2006 Women's NCAA tournament. It was the ninth edition of the postseason Women's National Invitation Tournament and the first to be played with a 40-team field, expanded from 32 the year prior.

Tournament bracket

Region 1
*Host • Source

Region 2
*Host • Source

Region 3
*Host • Source

Region 4
*Host • Source

Semifinals and final
*Host • Source

References

Women's National Invitation Tournament
Women's National Invitation Tournament
Women's National Invitation Tournament
Women's National Invitation Tournament